Nodaway is a city in Nodaway Township, Adams County, Iowa, United States. The population was 74 at the time of the 2020 census. Nodaway was incorporated in 1900.

History
Nodaway was a shipping point on the Chicago, Burlington and Quincy Railroad.

Geography
Nodaway is located at  (40.937486, -94.894207).

Demographics

2010 census
At the 2010 census there were 114 people in 47 households, including 31 families, in the city. The racial makup of the city was 98.2% White and 1.8% from two or more races.

Of the 47 households 27.7% had children under the age of 18 living with them, 51.1% were married couples living together, 8.5% had a female householder with no husband present, 6.4% had a male householder with no wife present, and 34.0% were non-families. 29.8% of households were one person and 10.6% were one person aged 65 or older. The average household size was 2.43 and the average family size was 3.00.

The median age was 39 years. 27.2% of residents were under the age of 18; 4.4% were between the ages of 18 and 24; 21.2% were from 25 to 44; 29% were from 45 to 64; and 18.4% were 65 or older. The gender makeup of the city was 50.0% male and 50.0% female.

2000 census
As of the census of 2000, there were 132 people in 58 households, including 38 families, in the city. The racial makup of the city was 100.00% White.

Of the 58 households 29.3% had children under the age of 18 living with them, 56.9% were married couples living together, 6.9% had a female householder with no husband present, and 32.8% were non-families. 29.3% of households were one person and 22.4% were one person aged 65 or older. The average household size was 2.28 and the average family size was 2.77.

Age spread:  22.0% under the age of 18, 5.3% from 18 to 24, 18.2% from 25 to 44, 31.8% from 45 to 64, and 22.7% 65 or older. The median age was 48 years. For every 100 females, there were 94.1 males. For every 100 females age 18 and over, there were 94.3 males.

The median household income was $34,375 and the median family income  was $34,792. Males had a median income of $31,750 versus $21,667 for females. The per capita income for the city was $16,722. There were 8.9% of families and 11.6% of the population living below the poverty line, including 26.1% of under eighteens and 12.5% of those over 64.

Education
Nodaway is within the Villisca Community School District. Residents are zoned to Southwest Valley High School, operated by the Corning Community School District, and shared with the Villisca district as part of a grade-sharing agreement.

References

Cities in Adams County, Iowa
Cities in Iowa
1900 establishments in Iowa
Populated places established in 1900